Miss Brazil World 2016 was the 27th edition of the Miss Brazil World pageant and the 2nd under CNB Miss Brazil. The contest took place on June 25, 2016. Each state, the Federal District and various Insular Regions & Cities competed for the title. Catharina Choi of Ilhabela crowned her successor, Beatrice Fontoura of Goiás at the end of the contest. Fontoura represented Brazil at Miss World 2016. The contest was held at the Resort Il Campanario in Florianópolis, Santa Catarina, Brazil.

Results

Regional Queens of Beauty

Special Awards

Challenge Events

Beauty with a Purpose

Beauty & Photography

Best in Interview

Miss Popularity

Miss Talent

Miss Top Model

Night Fashion

Sports

Delegates
The delegates for Miss Brazil World 2016 were:

States

 - Jucyelly Pereira
 - Brena Wanzeler
 - Tayana Maia
 - Lavínia Calumby
 - Raíra Cendi
 - Carolline Torres
 - Stephany Pim
 - Beatrice Fontoura
 - Amanda Barbacena
 - Renata Sena
 - Mariana Vieira
 - Victória Pinto
 - Taynara Gargantini
 - Leidyane Vasconcelos
 - Carolina Ermel
 - Vanessa Muniz
 - Caroline Venturini
 - Karliany Barbosa
 - Nayara Guimarães
 - Isabele Pandini
 - Katiúscia Menezes

Insular Regions and Cities

 Cataratas do Iguaçu - Tamíres Terrazon
 Cerrado Goiano - Laís Gava
 Costa Verde & Mar - Sara Ramos
 - Francielly Ouriques
 Greater Florianópolis - Flaviane Elias
 Ilha da Pintada - Jheniffer Ev
 Ilha do Mel - Katherin Strickert
 Ilha dos Lobos - Gabriela Frühauf
 Ilhas de Búzios - Vitória Félix
 Ilhas do Araguaia - Jhaddy Hayra
 Jurerê Internacional - Nayara Silveira
 Marajó - Yasmin Engelke
 Missões - Muriel Prestes
 Pampa Gaúcho - Samen dos Santos
 Pantanal - Kelly Sendy
 Plano Piloto - Ana Gabriela Borges
 Triângulo Mineiro - Marianne Faina
 - Letícia Angelino
 Vale dos Sinos - Carolina Luz
 - Nicoli Lindner

Notes

Replacements
 - Jéssica Duarte was originally supposed to represent Mato Grosso at Miss Brazil World 2016 but withdrew and was replaced by Amanda Barbacena.

Withdrawals
 - Kimberly Maciel
 Ilhabela - Alice Silva
 Ilha do Bananal - Marcela Castro 
 - Mariana Andrade
 Vale do Araguaia - Mikaela Freitas

Did not compete

References

External links
 Official site (in Portuguese)

2016
2016 in Brazil
2016 beauty pageants
Beauty pageants in Brazil